Michael Gruber (born 5 December 1979 in Schwarzach im Pongau) is an Austrian nordic combined skier who competed from 1997 to 2008. He won a gold medal in the 4 x 5 km team event at the 2006 Winter Olympics in Turin.

Gruber won two 4 x 5 km team event medals at the FIS Nordic World Ski Championships with a gold in 2003 and a bronze in 2005. He has two individual career victories (1998: 7.5 km sprint, 2004: 15 km individual).

He retired after the 2007-08 season.

References
Database Olympics record
FIS Newsflash 177 announcement of Gruber's retirement. April 30, 2008.

1979 births
Living people
People from St. Johann im Pongau District
Nordic combined skiers at the 2002 Winter Olympics
Nordic combined skiers at the 2006 Winter Olympics
Olympic gold medalists for Austria
Olympic bronze medalists for Austria
Olympic Nordic combined skiers of Austria
Austrian male Nordic combined skiers
Olympic medalists in Nordic combined
FIS Nordic World Ski Championships medalists in Nordic combined
Medalists at the 2006 Winter Olympics
Medalists at the 2002 Winter Olympics
Recipients of the Decoration of Honour for Services to the Republic of Austria
Sportspeople from Salzburg (state)